Aviation Security in Airport Development (ASIAD) is an anti-terrorism program implemented by the Department for Transport in the United Kingdom to incorporate design elements into airports that will impart resistance to bomb blasts. Components such as heat-strengthened laminated glass are used for windows, security barriers, and terminal facades.

Designs employed
 Bespoke structural bonding of frame to glass.
 Increasing the strength of components for track and door running systems
 Maintaining flexibility and ductility of door frame components
 Restriction of projectile components when high forces of an explosive event occur
 Increasing robustness of drive motors, running gears, and operating systems
 Incorporating combinations of multi-laminated glass at varying thicknesses and with anti-shard glass properties
 Built-in sensors for reaction on forced opening, etc
 Blast-resistant anti-jump runner systems
 Toughened sensor controls
 Post-blast retained structural barriers to stop physical attacks, unauthorized or forced entrees, or escapes

References

Aviation security
Airport infrastructure